Richard LaMonte Troedson (born May 1, 1950) is a retired American pitcher in Major League Baseball who played from  through  for the San Diego Padres. He was selected by the Padres in the 1st round (6th pick) of the 1972 out of Santa Clara University.

In a two-season career, Troedson posted an 8–10 record with a 4.74 earned run average in 65 appearances, including 19 starts, two complete games and two saves, giving up 90 earned runs on 191 hits and 67 walks while striking out 92 in 171.0 innings of work.

See also
1973 San Diego Padres season
1974 San Diego Padres season

References

External links

Retrosheet

San Diego Padres players
Major League Baseball pitchers
Baseball players from San Jose, California
Santa Clara Broncos baseball players
Hawaii Islanders players
Sportspeople from Palo Alto, California
1950 births
Living people
Tri-City Padres players
Alexandria Aces players
Sultanes de Monterrey players
American expatriate baseball players in Mexico